ServedBy the Net, LLC. is a cloud computing provider specializing in infrastructure as a service. The company provides infrastructure for efforts such as virtual servers, storage, and server backup. The company's current slogan is "Serving Clouds from Seattle."

History
ServedBy the Net was founded in Seattle, Washington by Joshua Breeds. Breeds developed an interest in the cloud and technology sector from the age of 10, when he developed his first web hosting company. Years later, Breeds founded ServedBy the Net, LLC, in 2011, while he was working on his biochemistry degree from the University of Washington. As of 2014, the organization is a technology partner of Microsoft, VMWare, Parallels, SUSE, and F5 Networks.

Services
ServedBy the Net offers Cloud IaaS (Infrastructure as a Service) as well as hosted services such as managed cloud services and domain name registration.

References

Cloud computing providers
Cloud infrastructure
Organizations based in Seattle